Jadwiga Maria Wiśniewska (born 2 July 1963 in Myszków) is a Polish politician and teacher.

Biography
She graduated from the Higher Pedagogical School in Częstochowa. For many years she worked as a teacher and then headmaster of a primary school in Gniazdów.

From 2002 she was a member of the council of Myszków County. In parliamentary election in 2005 she was elected to Sejm from the Law and Justice list. She received re-election in 2007 and 2011.

She became the vice-chairperson of the Law and Justice in Częstochowa district and a member of the party's political council. In the elections to the European Parliament in 2014, she was elected from the Law and Justice list from Silesian Voivodeship. In the European Parliament elections in 2019, she successfully applied for re-election, obtaining the third best result in the country (409 373 votes).

References

External links
Jadwiga Wiśniewska - parliamentary page - includes declarations of interest, voting record, and transcripts of speeches.

1963 births
Living people
People from Myszków
Members of the Polish Sejm 2005–2007
Law and Justice MEPs
MEPs for Poland 2014–2019
Women members of the Sejm of the Republic of Poland
Women MEPs for Poland
Members of the Polish Sejm 2007–2011
MEPs for Poland 2019–2024